In enzymology, a jasmonate O-methyltransferase is an enzyme that catalyzes the chemical reaction

S-adenosyl-L-methionine + jasmonate  S-adenosyl-L-homocysteine + methyl jasmonate

Thus, the two substrates of this enzyme are S-adenosyl methionine and jasmonate, whereas its two products are S-adenosylhomocysteine and methyl jasmonate.

This enzyme belongs to the family of transferases, specifically those transferring one-carbon group methyltransferases.  The systematic name of this enzyme class is S-adenosyl-L-methionine:jasmonate O-methyltransferase. This enzyme is also called jasmonic acid carboxyl methyltransferase.

References

Further reading 

 

EC 2.1.1
Enzymes of unknown structure